A Ceremony of Carols, Op. 28 is an extended choral composition for Christmas by Benjamin Britten scored for three-part treble chorus, solo voices, and harp. The text, structured in eleven movements, is taken from The English Galaxy of Shorter Poems, edited by Gerald Bullett. It is principally in Middle English, with some Latin and Early Modern English. It was composed in 1942 on Britten's sea voyage from the United States to England.

Britten composed the music at the same time as the Hymn to St. Cecilia and in similar style. Originally conceived as a series of unrelated songs, it was later unified into one piece with the framing processional and recessional chant in unison based on the Gregorian antiphon "Hodie Christus natus est". A harp solo based on the chant, along with a few other motifs from "Wolcum Yole", also serves to unify the composition. In addition, the movements "This Little Babe" and "Deo Gracias" have the choir reflecting harp-like effects by employing a canon at the first in stretto.

The original 1942 publication was written for SSA (soprano, soprano, alto) children's choir. In 1943, a SATB (soprano, alto, tenor, bass) arrangement was published for a mixed choir. Many of the movements are written as rounds or call-and-response pieces – lyrically simple for the sake of the children performing. There are three-part divisi in both the tenor and bass parts. Each of these lines individually mirrors a line in either the soprano or alto parts, as though the tenor and bass sections are a men's choir singing the original SSA composition with an SSA choir.

Movements

1. Procession "Hodie Christus natus est" 
"Hodie Christus natus est" is a Gregorian antiphon to the Magnificat at Second Vespers of Christmas. It is sung exclusively by the sopranos and is patterned on a traditional processional in Christian church service. It has no time signature and can be sung in flexible tempo. The last several measures can be repeated to allow the whole ensemble to take their places.

2. Wolcum Yole! 
The second movement is an upbeat and festive piece intended to welcome the important days of the coming period: Yule (25th), Saint Stephen's Day (26th), St John's Day (27th), Day of the Innocents (28th), Thomas Becket (29th), New Year, Twelfth Day, Candlemas (2nd Feb). The text is written in Middle English.

3. There is no rose 
The text of "There is no Rose" is kept at Trinity College (MS 0.3.58) and dates to the early 15th century. It presents a more reverent tone than the previous movement, as the choir admires the beauty of the birth of Jesus. The sopranos and altos sing the melody in a soft, prayerful manner, while the rest of the ensemble occasionally joins them to sing in unison. This is a macaronic piece, meaning the text is in both a vernacular language (English, in this case) and Latin.

4. That yongë child 
"That yongë child" consists of a soprano solo with harp accompaniment. The reverent tone from the previous piece carries over into this one, except this piece is more recitative.

5. Balulalow 
The text of "Balulalow" is found written by brothers Wedderburn around 1548. It includes the rest of the ensemble and acts as a contrast to the first part. It has a different keys, rhythm, and an overall more jubilant tone than "That yongë child". "Balulalow" is meant to be a lullaby for the baby Jesus, and the soprano solo at the beginning of the movement paints an image of The Virgin Mary singing a lullaby to her newborn child.

6. "As Dew in Aprille" 
"As Dew in Aprille" was written by Sloane  in the first quarter of the 15th century. It switches the focus from the baby to the Virgin Mary in gentle, soothing music which progressively grows softer until the very end. Throughout this movement, the different voice parts overlap to create an echoing effect. The volume of the choir abruptly shifts at the end from pianissississimo (very, very, very softly) to forte (loudly).

7. This Little Babe 
"This Little Babe", from Robert Southwell's Newe Heaven, Newe Warre from 1595, contrasts with every other movement, in a darker approach and often using imagery of hell. It depicts a battle between the baby and Satan (good and evil), which is conveyed in its swift tempo, polyrhythms, overlapping segments between the voices, and the fact that the song grows progressively louder over the duration of the movement. The music reaches its climax with an intense key change and conflicting rhythm from the rest of the piece.

8. Interlude 
This instrumental movement is a harp solo, creating a sense of angelic bliss with its slow tempo, shifting rhythm, and progressively soft nature.

9. In Freezing Winter Night 
"In Freezing Winter Night" is another text by Southwell. This movement calls out to the circumstances of the birth of Jesus and employs the choir to sing in a round to create an echoing effect. The choir and harp progress through the movement at contrasting paces and, over the duration of the piece, gradually synchronise until they both move at the same pace just before the ending when the music fades out. This is meant to symbolise the discord on earth before and during the birth of Christ and the hope of the future and the harmony he brings.

10. Spring Carol
"Spring Carol" is on a text which was also set by William Cornysh in the 16th century. Britten set it as a duet between two sopranos that depicts the signs of spring. It originates from a carol set by William Cornysh. This movement ends with a call to thank God, which transitions appropriately to the next movement.

11. Deo gracias – Adam lay i-bounden 
"Deo gracias" (Thanks be to God) is based on a macaronic poem from the 15th century. "Adam lay i-bounden"  tells of the events that happened in Chapter 3 of Genesis, the "Fall of Man" as Eve is tricked into eating the fruit of sin. Note the idea of Adam's sin as a 'happy fault,' emphasized by the last stanza - "Blessèd be the time That appil takè was" - introduced by St. Ambrose and St. Augustine and further developed by Thomas Aquinas in the thirteenth century. At the end of the piece, a cross can be displayed in the text to signify the crucifixion of Christ as well as the redemption of mankind. Britten has set the choir in such a way that the choir becomes emphatic in its thanks to God. Use of syncopated (emphasis of the off-beat to create a displacement of rhythm) and staccato (short and detached) rhythms emphasise this energetic thankfulness, while only a small section very quietly recounts the plight of humanity. The harp and choir both gradually grow more resounding until the very last chord.

12. "Recession" ("Hodie Christus natus est") 
This movement is a near mirror of the Procession and the ensemble, typically, performs this piece as they exit the stage. Its melody gradually fades as the ensemble retreats outside of the venue.

Discography 
Recordings of the complete work include:
 RCA Victor Chorale of women's voices, Robert Shaw conductor, Laura Newell harpist (1952)
 Choir of St John's College, Cambridge, George Guest, Marisa Robles (1965)
 Choir of King's College, Cambridge, David Willcocks, Osian Ellis (1972)
 Wandsworth School Boys' Choir (1972), Susan Drake harpist
 Christ Church Cathedral Choir, Oxford (1982)
 Westminster Cathedral Choir (1986)
 New London Children's Choir (1995), Ronald Corp, Skaila Kanga (harp)
 Cincinnati Boychoir (1996)
 Robert Shaw Chamber Singers (1997)
 Australian Boys Choir (2013)
 Choir of New College, Oxford, Edward Higginbottom (2013)
 Czech Philharmonic Children's Choir (2017)

References

Further reading 
 Carpenter, Humphrey. Benjamin Britten: A Biography (London: Faber, 1992)

External links 
 Boosey & Hawkes: A Ceremony of Carols, Op 28
 Programme note by Len Mullenger. Retrieved October 17, 2010

Choral compositions
Compositions by Benjamin Britten
1942 compositions
Christmas carol collections
Christmas cantatas